Yawmyat Rajoul Mahzoom (Diary of a Defeated Man) is the eighteenth album by Kadim Al Sahir, released on March 29, 2007. This album contains many songs from the poet Nizar Qabbani.

Track listing

External links
Kazem Al-Saher: Yawmyat Rajoul Mahzoom album at shamra.com

2007 albums
Arabic-language albums
Kadim Al Sahir albums
Rotana Records albums